Durchak (also Romanized as Dūrchāk and Dowrchāk; also known as Darchāk) is a village in Rudbar-e Mohammad-e Zamani Rural District, Alamut-e Gharbi District, Qazvin County, Qazvin Province, Iran. At the 2006 census, its population was 305, in 107 families.

References 

Populated places in Qazvin County